The 1924 Coupe de France Final was a football match held at Stade Olympique, Colombes on April 13, 1924, that saw Olympique de Marseille defeat FC Sète 3–2 thanks to goals by Edouard Crut (2) and Jean Boyer.

Match details

See also
Coupe de France 1923-1924

External links
Coupe de France results at Rec.Sport.Soccer Statistics Foundation
Report on French federation site

Coupe De France Final
1924
Coupe De France Final 1924
Coupe De France Final 1924
Coupe de France Final
Coupe de France Final